Harry B. Eaton was a state legislator in North Carolina. He lived in Williamsboro, North Carolina. He was African American. He served in the North Carolina House of Representatives in 1883. He was re-elected to serve a term in 1885 before losing an election for a state senate seat.

He joined the Populist Party. He represented Warren County, North Carolina and Vance County, North Carolina.

See also 

 African-American officeholders during and following the Reconstruction era

References

Year of birth missing
Year of death missing
Members of the North Carolina House of Representatives
People from Vance County, North Carolina
African-American state legislators in North Carolina
19th-century African-American politicians
19th-century American politicians
North Carolina Populists